The Austrian World Summit is a climate conference which takes places annually in Vienna since 2017. It aims at connecting stakeholders from politics, civil society and business to create a broad alliance for climate protection. It is organised by the Schwarzenegger Climate Initiative and took place at the Hofburg palace and the Spanish Riding School in the past. Arnold Schwarzenegger was the initiator of the conference and he organises it together with Monika Langthaler. The summit takes place under the patronage of Austrian president Alexander Van der Bellen.

Concept 
The conference wants to contribute to achieving a full implementation of the Paris Agreement and the Sustainable Development Goals as well as networking of politics, business and finances with the United Nations, NGOs, regions and cities. In comparison to other climate conferences, the Austrian World Summit is not mainly a diplomatic conference but aims at showcasing concrete examples and possible actions for a sustainable future. Since its inception in 2017, the Austrian World Summit has become one of the most prominent climate conferences worldwide. In fact, it was the largest climate conference in 2020 since similar events had to be cancelled due to the Covid-19 outbreak. Among the speakers and participants of the conference so far were António Guterres, Greta Thunberg, Patricia Espinosa Cantellano, Li Yong, Maria Neira, Kristalina Georgieva and Scott Joseph Kelly.

The most recent summit took place on 1 July, 2021 under the motto “Healthy Planet – Healthy People” with well-known speakers like Lisa Jackson (Sustainability Manager at Apple), Greta Thunberg (Climate activist) or Jane Goodall (Scientist). Since the Covid-19 pandemic, the AWS has taken place in hybrid mode. Each year, more than 1,000 people participate physically and millions of viewers watch the livestream online or on TV.

A speech by Austrian chancellor Sebastian Kurz in 2018 was criticized by the activist group System Change, not Climate Change due to the Austrian government's lack of climate policies. The group staged a protest at the summit and took over the microphone during Kurz's speech.

In 2019 and 2020, the summit was accompanied by a festival for the public, a Climate Kirtag, which is supposed to raise awareness for climate issues among the public in Vienna. The first edition featured concerts by Hubert von Goisern and Conchita Wurst.

The next Austrian World Summit is going to take place on 14 June, 2022 – exactly 30 years after the “Earth Summit” in Rio de Janeiro. The environmental activist Severn Cullis-Suzuki who gave an inflammatory speech in Rio de Janeiro is expected. Other well-known speakers and guests include Joko Winterscheidt (German entertainer), Luisa Neubauer (Climate activist), Matt Iseman (US moderator).

Legacy 
In 2019, the conference won the European Culture Award Taurus for extraordinary contributions to European culture.

In 2020, the Austrian World Summit took place in September with 340 participants. It was the biggest climate conference to take place that year because of the cancellation of all major climate conferences due to the COVID-19 pandemic.

References

External links 
 Official website

Political conferences
Events in Vienna
Climate change policy
Climate change in Austria